This is a list of Romanian football transfers for the 2022–23 summer transfer window. Only moves featuring 2022–23 Liga I are listed.

Liga I

Argeș Pitești

In:

Out:

Botoșani

In:

Out:

CFR Cluj

In:

Out:

Chindia Târgoviște

In:

Out:

Farul Constanța

In:

Out:

FC U Craiova

In:

Out:

FCSB

In:

Out:

Hermannstadt

In:

Out:

Mioveni

In:

Out:

Petrolul Ploiești

In:

Out:

Rapid București

In:

Out:

Sepsi Sfântu Gheorghe

In:

Out:

Universitatea Cluj

In:

Out:

Universitatea Craiova

In:

Out:

UTA Arad

In:
 	

Out:

Voluntari

In:

Out:

References

Romania
2022